Banaft Rural District is a rural district (dehestan) in Dodangeh District, Sari County, Mazandaran Province, Iran. At the 2006 census, its population was 3,209, in 901 families. The rural district has 11 villages.

References 

Rural Districts of Mazandaran Province
Sari County